Kandakurthi is a village in Renjal mandal of Nizamabad district in the Indian state of Telangana. As of 2011, The village has a total number of 929 houses and the population of 4563 of which include 2360 are males while 2203 are females. The place is a famous tourist attraction as it is the confluence point of River Godavari, Manjira River and Haridra River.
The village is located at close proximity to Maharashtra border and 30 kilometers from its district headquarters Nizamabad, Telangana. The founder of RSS, Dr Keshav Baliram Hedgewar is native of Kandakurthi.

References 

Villages in Nizamabad district